Liaki Moli (born 4 January 1990) is a New Zealand-born Japanese rugby union player, who specialises as a lock forward. He played for the Blues in Super Rugby from 2012 to 2014, and signed for the Japanese Sunwolves for the 2016 season. Also, he has played for Auckland in the ITM Cup since 2010. He is of Tongan and Niuean descent.

Career

Early career
Moli was selected for the New Zealand U20 side in 2010, for whom he was a standout player at the world championship in Argentina. He made his Auckland debut in the same year. He was also named the age-group player of the year for 2010 by the NZRU.

Super Rugby
A serious shoulder injury at the end of 2010 ruled Moli out of contention for a Super Rugby contract in 2011, meaning 2012 is his first season with the Blues.

Moli was signed by the Japanese Sunwolves for the 2016 season.

External links 
 Blues player profile
 Auckland player profile

References

1990 births
New Zealand rugby union players
New Zealand sportspeople of Tongan descent
New Zealand people of Niuean descent
Blues (Super Rugby) players
Auckland rugby union players
Rugby union locks
Rugby union players from Auckland
Living people
New Zealand expatriate rugby union players
New Zealand expatriate sportspeople in Japan
Expatriate rugby union players in Japan
People educated at St Paul's College, Auckland
Sunwolves players
Hino Red Dolphins players
Yokohama Canon Eagles players